Darka & Slavko (in Ukrainian Дарка й Славко) was a popular musical duo of two first generation Ukrainians: Darka Konopada & Slavko Halatyn met in the mid-80's through their involvement with a Ukrainian college group's poetry reading for political prisoners. Here began a ten-year musical collaboration as well as an eight-year marriage.

The duo lived in and worked out of the New York City area.

Under the name "Darka & Slavko" the duo released four albums and produced many projects for other musicians. Initially they focused attention on creating a sound that was comprehensive for Ukrainian Americans who, until then, considered Ukrainian music existing only for the older generation. "Darka & Slavko" wanted to change that.

On their first album, simply entitled, Darka & Slavko, one of the songs they chose to do was Volodymyr Ivasyuk's Chervona Ruta. It was specifically arranged within a Reggae genre for a couple of reasons: they wanted to add some shock value to their first album and also, they believed, Volodymyr would have approved this.

Their second album, Khvylyna (Moment) gave way to more sophisticated arrangements and the duo began to write original songs. Finally in 1995, "Darka & Slavko"  released their final studio album, Povir (Believe) which was a collection of entirely original songs. One of the songs, Spivtsi (Singers) was written about the life and death of Volodymyr Ivasyuk and how it sparked an explosion of Ukrainian pop music development that continues until today.  This song was written on a train from Lviv to Chernivtsi and two days later was debuted at Ukraine's first contemporary music festival "Chervona Ruta" in 1989 - where the duo and their newly formed group were ultimately awarded Favorite International Band 

"Darka & Slavko" continued to perform in concerts around the world, and in addition to their three studio albums, they also recorded a live album with jazz renditions of their favorite songs. In 1997, "Darka & Slavko" had split up personally and professionally.

Currently both have remarried and are continuing their music careers. Slavko has recorded an album in 2001 entitled The Weight of Words under the name Slau and also continues to run his recording studio. Darka continues to sing and compose music under the name Darka Dusty, and is currently working on a new album.

In July 2012 Darka & Slavko agreed to perform a reunion concert at the Ukrainian American Youth Association in Ellenville, NY.

Albums
 Darka & Slavko (1987), LP, BeSharp Records 
 Khvylyna (Хвилина), (1987), LP, CD, BeSharp Records 
 Povir (Повір),  (1995), CD, BeSharp Records 
 Unplugged,  (1995), cassette, BeSharp Records
 Retro Perspective (2012), CD, BeSharp Records

References

External links
 Site of Slau (Slavko Halatyn)
 Site of Darka Dusty
 Review of Ukrweekly
 Review of Ukrweekly
 Review of Ukrweekly
 Дует «Дарка та Славко»
 Article from: The Ukrainian Weekly 
 Joy Tartaglia Украина потеряла - Америка подобрала

Ukrainian musical groups